Jia Hongguang (born April 6, 1988) is a Chinese Paralympic swimmer competing in the S6. At the 2012 Summer Paralympics in London he won a silver medal in the 100 m backstroke (S6). He won the silver medal at the Men's 100 metre backstroke S6 event at the 2016 Summer Paralympics with 1:13.42.

References

Paralympic swimmers of China
Swimmers at the 2012 Summer Paralympics
Living people
1988 births
Paralympic gold medalists for China
Paralympic silver medalists for China
Paralympic bronze medalists for China
Medalists at the 2012 Summer Paralympics
Chinese male backstroke swimmers
Chinese male breaststroke swimmers
S6-classified Paralympic swimmers
Sportspeople from Shandong
Swimmers at the 2016 Summer Paralympics
Swimmers at the 2020 Summer Paralympics
Medalists at the 2016 Summer Paralympics
Medalists at the 2020 Summer Paralympics
Medalists at the World Para Swimming Championships
Paralympic medalists in swimming
21st-century Chinese people